Orthetrum testaceum, common names Crimson Dropwing or Orange Skimmer. is an Asian freshwater dragonfly species belonging to the family Libellulidae.

Subspecies
Subspecies include:
 Orthetrum testaceum soembanum Foerster, 1903
 Orthetrum testaceum testaceum (Burmeister, 1839)

Distribution and habitat
This common species is widespread throughout India, Indonesia, Malaysia, Philippines, Singapore and Thailand. These dragonflies may occur in various areas with standing waters, as in ponds, drains, marshes, around rivers, streams, lakes, and  gardens.

Description

In these large dragonflies the thorax of adult males is orange-brown, with a vermilion red abdomen. The eyes are light brownish. The wings are smoky transparent, with an amber patch at the base. In adult females and in recently emerged males the body is olive-green to brown in colour with black markings and a clear base of the hindwings.

These dragonflies are rather similar to Orthetrum chrysis, but O. testaceum is more reddish, while O. chrysis has a reddish brown thorax.

Biology and behavior
The males regularly perch near ponds, while the females usually fly to water only during mating season and egg-laying. In this case the males guard them by flying over them.

See also 
 Orthetrum

References 

Tol J. van - Odonata: Catalogue of the Odonata of the World.

External links
 World Odonata List – Slater Museum of Natural History University of Puget Sound, Tacoma, WA 98416, USA
 Dragonflies & Damselflies of Thailand
 Odonata of Peninsular Malaysia

Insects described in 1839
Libellulidae
Insects of the Philippines
Insects of Malaysia
Insects of Indonesia
Insects of Thailand
Insects of Singapore
Insects of India
Articles containing video clips